The Ministry of European Integration was a department of the Albanian Government, responsible for integration of Albania into the European Union. On 13 September 2017, the ministry was dissolved and merged with the Ministry of Foreign Affairs.

History
On 2 October 1998, to meet the increased workload in the process of accession of Albania to the European Union and NATO, the Majko I Government appointed to the Council of Ministers Maqo Lakrori as Secretary of State for Euro-Atlantic Integration. Lakrori stayed in office until October 25, 1999.

With the return of Pandeli Majko as Prime Minister on 22 February 2002, the Ministry of Euro-Atlantic Integration was established. As minister was appointed Marko Bello.

Since the establishment of the institution, the Ministry of European Integration has been reorganized by merging with other ministries, thus making its name change several times. This list reflects the changes made since 2002:

 Ministry of Euro-Atlantic Integration (Ministria e Integrimit Euroatlantik) from 2002 to 2005
 Ministry of Integration (Ministria e Integrimit) from 2005 to 2013
 Ministry of European Integration (Ministria e Integrimit Europian) from 2013 to 2017 (dissolved)

The ministry was dissolved in September 2017. The department of integration was merged with the Ministry for Europe and Foreign Affairs.

Officeholders (2002–2017)

References

Integration
Politics of Albania
1912 establishments in Albania
Albania